Mark Sehested Pedersen (born 6 November 1991 in Kalundborg) is a Danish former professional cyclist.

Major results

2012
 1st Stage 4 Rás Tailteann
2013
 5th Tour of Nanjing
2015
 3rd Overall Tour of Yancheng Coastal Wetlands
 9th GP Viborg
2017
 10th International Rhodes Grand Prix

References

External links

1991 births
Living people
Danish male cyclists
People from Kalundborg
Sportspeople from Region Zealand